The Bert Dosh Memorial Bridge, also known as the Delks Bluff Bridge, carries State Road 40 over the Ocklawaha River in north-central Florida, east of Silver Springs.

Originally planned as part of the Cross Florida Barge Canal project, the bridge was under construction at the time of the decision by President Richard Nixon to halt work on the canal project, and it was decided to complete the high-level bridge, which opened in 1972. The bridge was renamed in 1976 for R.N. "Bert" Dosh, an Ocala Evening Star newspaper editor who championed the construction of the canal.

References

 "Canal Authority asks okay for SR 40 Bridge", Ocala Star-Banner, 24 January 1967
 "It crosses the Ocklawaha, name it Ocklawaha Bridge", Ocala Star-Banner, 7 May 1972
 "SR 40 bridge dedicated to Bert Dosh in ceremony", Ocala Star-Banner'', 29 August 1976
 FDOT Florida Bridge Data 01-05-2010

Road bridges in Florida
Bridges completed in 1972
Transportation buildings and structures in Marion County, Florida
1972 establishments in Florida